German-Chilean relations are foreign relations between Germany and Chile. Around 12,300 kilometers separate Chile and Germany but both nations still share a wide range of bilateral relations. Over the course of the last 150 years many Germans have settled in Chile for several different reasons. Migrating in the opposite direction, several thousand Chileans sought refuge in Germany during Pinochet's dictatorship.

The first ties between modern-day Germany and Chile can be traced back to the 16th century when the first German settlers arrived in the newly founded settlements. In 1810, when Chile became independent from Spain, Hamburg was one of the first cities that engaged in intense trade with Valparaiso. During the revolution of Germany in 1848, as Chile encouraged Germans to emigrate, more and more German settlers arrived in Chile.

In modern days' relationship, Chileans view Germany positively, and in the same reason, Germans view Chile exact similar.

History and immigration

The origin of the massive immigration of Germans (includes Poles due to Partitions of Poland) to Chile is found in the so-called "Law of Selective Immigration" of 1845.The "law's" objective was to bring middle and upper-class people to colonize regions in the south of Chile, between Valdivia and Puerto Montt. More than 6,000 families arrived in Chile during this period alone.

The German immigrants succeeded in creating vigorous villages and communities in virtually uninhabited regions, completely changing the landscape of the southern zones. Carlos Anwandter left evidence of this great spirit of building, proclaiming to all the colonists: We will be Chileans, as honorable and hardworking as ever there were, we will defend our adopted country united in the ranks of our new compatriots, against all foreign oppression and with the resolve and fortitude of the man that defends his country, his family, and his interests. This country that we have adopted as sons will never have reason to repent of its enlightened, humane, and generous gesture... (18 November 1851).

The prestige of Germany and German culture  in Chile remained high after the First World War but did not return to its pre-war levels. Indeed in Chile the war bought an end to a period of scientific and cultural influence writer Eduardo de la Barra scorningly called "the German bewichment".

Later years brought a new, great wave of German immigrants who settled throughout the country, especially in Temuco, Santiago, and in the country's principal commercial zones. Chile broke relations with Germany and declared war in 1943; during World War II, many German Jews settled in Chile, fleeing the Holocaust, while foreign citizens suspected of Nazi sympathies were sent to the Pisagua internment camp. After the war, many leaders and collaborators from Nazi Germany sought to take refuge in the southern region of the country, fleeing justice against them. Paul Schäfer even founded Colonia Dignidad (Dignity Colony), a German enclave in Region VII, where human rights violations were carried out.

Among the many distinguished Chileans of German descent are the commander Fernando Matthei Aubel, the architect Mathias Klotz, tennis players Gabriel Silberstein and Hans Gildemeister, the athletes Sebastián Keitel and Marlene Ahrens, the musicians Patricio Manns and Emilio Körner, the economist Ernesto Schiefelbein, the politicians Miguel Kast and Evelyn Matthei, the entrepreneurs Jürgen Paulmann and Carlos Heller, the painters Uwe Grumann and Rossy Ölckers, television presenters Karen Doggenweiler and Margot Kahl, writer César Müller, and the actors Gloria Münchmeyer, Antonia Zegers, Aline Küppenheim, and Bastian Bodenhofer.

Since 1973
The coup by Augusto Pinochet against Chilean President Salvador Allende on September 11, 1973 sparked the biggest migratory wave in Chile’s history. Even though the number of migration is heavily tipped towards Spain, this can be traced back to closer cultural ties for Chileans to Spain as a first European country to which to migrate other than Germany. Additionally, after World War 1 Germany lost its colonies, meaning many Germans migrated out of Germany, where channels into Germany were more sealed than has been the case in countries with huge colonial presences i.e. France, England, Spain.

Roughly 7,000 Chileans arrived in Germany, fleeing from the dictatorship. Approximately 4,000 were taken in by the Federal Republic of Germany while Communist East Germany (GDR) granted political asylum to 3,000 Chileans. It was the first time that German society in both states came into contact with a large group of exiled Latin American politicians. 

A number of diverse Chilean solidarity groups sprang up in both German states. Some of them thought that they could keep up the fight and topple the Pinochet regime from Germany. In that West German city, there was a politically active Chilean community in the 1970s and 1980s, associated with the Evangelical Church. Some political refugees even underwent military training in Communist East Germany. Some were even sent to Cuba for further training. Chile began the transition to democracy in 1990, led by President Patricio Aylwin. That was the beginning of a reverse migration as the vast majority of exiles returned to Chile.

But Germany still remains home to a Chilean community, the largest Latin American group after Brazilians and Cubans. An estimated 20,000 Chileans live in Germany, mainly concentrated in the cities of Berlin, Hamburg, Cologne and Munich. It includes second generation Chileans - those born in Germany to Chilean parents.

Today, it’s no longer political refugees making their way to Germany. According to Felipe Ramírez, the Chilean Consulate General in Munich, the current Chilean migration is made up by students who attend German universities, Chileans whose partners live in Germany, and a temporary migration of professionals who work for German companies.

Culture
German values have influenced Chilean culture and economic development and vice versa.  For example,

 The establishment of commercial houses and German shipping businesses in Valparaíso
 The foundation of the German Club in 1838
 The exploration of the Patagonia by the German Bernardo Phillipi, and his participation in the Chilean possession of the Strait of Magallanes
 The German immigration to the south of Chile after World War II
 Colonization and development of the city of Valdivia and the outskirts
 The exploitation of the nitrate fields
 The close relations between the ports of Valparaíso and Hamburg
 The establishment of a number of Chilean-German fire companies. (Nearly 20)
 Migration of ethnic Germans into Chile from Argentina in the early 20th century.
The Prussian Army had great influence on the Chilean Army. At the end of the 19th century, Chile adopted the Prussian military tradition, especially after the 1891 Chilean Civil War. A German military instructor, Emil Körner, reached the rank of commander-in-chief of the Chilean Army in 1900. Even today, the Chilean Army uses the Stahlhelm for ceremonial purposes, while the Chilean Military School still uses the Pickelhaube as part of the ceremonial uniform.
Chilean medicine was influenced by Dr. Max Westenhöfer (1871-1957), a German scientist, physician and pathologist from the University of Berlin who is considered the founder of anatomic pathology in Chile.  Prof. Westenhöfer established permanently in Chile as faculty member of the University of Chile, becoming an important figure in the intellectual Chilean environment.

In Germany is it also possible to find testimonies of the links between Chile and Germany.  The building Chilehaus (The House of Chile) in the port of Hamburg symbolizes the past trade relations between the countries.  The building was constructed in the 20th century, designed in the form of a bow of ship.

Treaties and Cooperation
Several treaties exists between Germany and Chile. From treaty of friendship, trade, investment and working treaties, school exchange treaties to treaties for joint research.

Trade
Germany is Chile’s principal trading partner within the European Union and continues to rank fifth worldwide among suppliers of Chilean imports. In 2013, Germany exported $3.2bn to Chile and Chile exported $2.1bn in goods to Germany and it is expected that the trade between both nations will continue to increase.

Germany’s principal exports to Chile are aircraft, ships, rail vehicles and cars, plant and mechanical engineering products, electricity generation and distribution equipment, electrical goods, medical and photographic equipment, measurement and control technology, chemical products and non-precious metal goods.

Copper and related products remain Chile’s principal exports to Germany. Germany also imports from Chile sizable quantities of fruit, preserved foods and juices, wine, fish and processed fish products, meat and animal-derived foods, cellulose, wood and chemical products.

Resident diplomatic missions

 Chile has an embassy in Berlin and consulates-general in Frankfurt, Hamburg and Munich.
 Germany has an embassy in Santiago.

Other
A weekly German - Chilean newspaper called "Condor" exists in Germany as well as several fraternities, the so-called "Burschenschaften"

See also
 German Chileans
 German influence in Chile

References

 
Bilateral relations of Germany
Germany